, known professionally as , was a female Japanese pop singer, songwriter, and member of the group Zard. As Sakai was the only member who stayed in the group while others joined and left regularly, Zard and Sakai may be referred to interchangeably. She was the best-selling female recording artist of the 1990s and has sold over 37 million copies of sales, making her one of the best-selling music artists in Japan of all time.

Biography 
Born in Hiratsuka, Kanagawa, Sakai grew up in Hadano, Kanagawa. Her father was a driving instructor, and she had a younger brother and younger sister. After her death, a neighbor recalled how popular and beautiful Sakai had been in elementary school. She was also athletic, joining the track and field team in junior high and playing tennis in high school. Graduating from Shoin Women's College (now Shoin University) in Atsugi City, Kanagawa, Sakai worked in a real estate company office for two years before being scouted by Stardust Promotion.

Throughout her life, Sakai remained with her family, living modestly and mostly out of the public eye. Upon achieving career success, she helped pay for her parents home renovation. Acquaintances say that she commuted by subway every day, often wore T-shirts and minimal makeup. She did not wear any makeup in all seven of the television appearances she made in her lifetime. In promoting her third single, "Mō Sagasanai," and first album, Good-bye My Loneliness on February 6, 1991, she wore glasses in the television interview, citing the fact she had not slept the night before. She also indicated that she often slept in the morning rather than the evening.

Sakai had a well-rounded personality. She began playing the piano at age four and aspired to be a musician at a very young age. She visited galleries, attended theater productions, made dry flowers, and painted in oil in her spare time. She also stated that one reason she did not like to travel was that she was not accustomed to eating sashimi and preferred cooked food. Because she was hardly ever seen in public, there were unsubstantiated conspiracy theories in Japan that works by Zard were not produced by the woman pictured (Sakai): She was referred to as an urban legend.

Sakai appears to have been shy. In her first appearance on Music Station, she was asked what took Zard so long to appear on camera. She replied that she wanted to make sure that the Zard project would in fact succeed first. In the other six interviews, Sakai expresses shyness on camera. In fact, a staff member revealed that when Sakai saw so many people lining up for her concert tour in 2004, she was taken aback and hid herself. After some effort, she was able to walk up to the crowd and thank them for coming. However, her shyness did not reflect an inability to work well with others. It has been noted that after she had gone home early one day she arranged for food to be sent to her staff at her office who were working late into the evening.

Professional career 
For the next two years following her scouting, she was a Toei "karaoke queen" and a promotional model appearing in television commercials for Japan Air System. The following year Sakai was a Nissin race queen. In 1990, Daiko Nagato, a music producer for Being Corporation, noted her potential as a singer-songwriter. Through this connection, she created a Being subsidiary called Sensui (same Kanji characters as Izumi) and started her career taking the name Izumi Sakai. In addition to taking a new name, Sakai revised her year of birth from 1967 to 1969.

In 1991, Sakai joined the five-member pop group Zard as lead vocalist. The group name did not have any particular meaning except Sakai felt that word Zard sounded like a rock group. She also took the name as derived from words such as "blizzard" and "wizard." The group's name very quickly became synonymous with Sakai herself, and Sakai wrote the lyrics to all of Zard's songs except Onna de Itai and Koionna no Yuuutsu, both of which were written by Daria Kawashima. By 1993, the four male band members left the group but Sakai chose to keep the Zard name throughout her career. Izumi Sakai was Zard's sole member at the time of the band's debut, although between late 1991 and early 1993 four other members were introduced.

The melodies of early Zard hits were written by prominent Japanese composers, most notably Seiichirō Kuribayashi and Tetsurō Oda. Izumi Sakai wrote nearly all of the lyrics to Zard songs, totalling over one hundred fifty. A veteran recording producer described that while most artists communicate through the transparent glass in the recording studio, Sakai preferred covering the glass with a curtain.

Her 1991 first single, "Good-bye My Loneliness," sold very well, but her next two faltered. The Good-bye My Loneliness promotion video depicts a youthful and energetic Sakai. A decade after her debut, she listed this song as one of her most memorable pieces, especially because she had to sing it over a hundred times to get the recording right. Her fourth single, "Nemurenai Yoru o Daite" (Hold me through the sleepless night) was extremely successful, leading to four television appearances. And her best was still to come.

On January 27, 1993, Izumi Sakai released her sixth single "Makenaide", which appealed to the Japanese public. Released at a time that is now seen as the beginning of Japan's post economic bubble era when the Nikkei 225 Index had shrunk in value by a third in only three years, "Makenaide" (Don't Give Up) became known as the theme song of the country's Lost Decade." While Sakai commented on the television show Music Station that it would be a song to encourage men taking college and company employment examinations, many people said this song helped them cope with difficult issues such as school bullying. What is notable about "Makenaide" is that Zard fans' favorite phrase, "Run through Until the End" was originally "Do Not Give Up until the End". "Makenaide"  has been used as a theme song for the Nippon Television program 24-hour TV, an annual charity program hosted live by celebrities for a whole day. Sakai said that she was honored and looked forward to watching 24-hour TV. Overall, "Makenaide" sold nearly 2 million copies.

Sakai produced 42 singles as well as 11 albums and 5 compilations in her lifetime. In addition to "Makenaide," she produced two other singles that sold over a million copies. Six of her albums as well as her first three compilations also surpassed the one-million mark. Sakai's CD sales had been in decline since 2000, but her death triggered an increase in CD sales.

Television appearances 
 Music Station (TV Asahi), "Nemurenai Yoru o Daite," August 7, 1992
 Music Station (TV Asahi), "Nemurenai Yoru o Daite," August 28, 1992
 Sound Arena (Fuji TV), "Nemurenai Yoru o Daite," September 1992
 Music Station (TV Asahi), "Nemurenai Yoru o Daite," September 18, 1992
 MJ-Music Journal (Fuji TV), "In My Arms Tonight," October 1992
 Music Station (TV Asahi), "In My Arms Tonight," October 6, 1992
 Music Station (TV Asahi), "Makenaide," February 5, 1993

Significance 
The NHK program Close Up Gendai reported on June 18, 2007, that the secret to Sakai's success was that she hardly was seen in public, which created a mystic aura.

Death 
According to the Kitto Wasurenai Official book, she had to stop her career temporarily due to various uterus-related illnesses in 2001, and did not begin working full-time until 2003. In June 2006, she was diagnosed with cervical cancer, for which she immediately underwent treatment. She appeared to have healed, but discovered that her cancer had spread to her lungs, indicating a Stage 4 cancer. She began undergoing treatment at Keio University Hospital in April 2007 but she never fully recovered.

However, Sakai was neither discouraged nor thought she was dying. After her death, the Japanese weekly magazine Friday ran an interview in which said Sakai thought that modern treatments would enable her to live long. Her mother said that she greeted her visitors cheerfully and did not seem to show the effects of her illness. A fellow patient later said that they walked together at times and Sakai sang "Makenaide" for her when she could not walk. Finally, Sakai sent an e-mail to her staff saying that she was anxious to go back to producing music and was looking forward to another concert in late 2007.

Sakai died on May 27, 2007. Police judged her death accidental, the result of a fall from the landing of an emergency-exit slope at Keio University Hospital, where she was undergoing chemotherapy. The slope appeared to be very slippery due to rain the day before. According to police, the fall took place during a walk on the morning of May 26, 2007, from a height of about 3 meters (about 9 feet and 10 inches). Sakai was discovered unconscious at around 5:40 a.m. by a passer-by and taken to the emergency room, where she died the following afternoon of head injuries. Due to the unusual and unlikely nature of her death, police investigated for possibility of suicide, but concluded that it was indeed an accident. In the Friday article, her mother said that she took walks in rehabilitation and the location where she fell was her favorite place to meditate. Sakai had been planning to release a new album in fall 2007, as well as launch her first live tour in three years. She was 40. Her family was at her side, but it was reported that she never regained consciousness.

Legacy
The sudden news of Sakai's death caused an uproar in the Japanese music industry and began to dominate headlines and the "what's new" spaces on many major music websites. Music Station, a TV program, did a four-minute tribute to her during its June 1, 2007 broadcast. Due to viewer request, another tribute was aired a week later.

The  was released on August 15, 2007. This book contains tracks of 16 years by "Izumi Sakai's poetry" and "Comments of the staff who have helped ZARD".

The book records that she was informed two days before she died, and that Sakai was encouraged by the news that she was selected. Furthermore, the day before she died, Sakai told a producer who had been with her for 16 years that she was looking forward to have a recording machine at her home so she could start working upon discharge from hospital.

Public and private memorial services 
A closed memorial service was held on June 26 at a funeral hall in Aoyama, Tokyo for members of the entertainment industry. This was attended by celebrities such as Maki Ohguro (another female vocalist who, like Sakai, rarely appears in public and writes most of her own material and like Sakai; a phantom singer). Almost as if to illustrate Sakai's impact on the Japanese music scene and the depth of her presence, singers Tak Matsumoto and Koshi Inaba, members of the popular B'z group, pop-singer Mai Kuraki, and even baseball giant Shigeo Nagashima all left moving messages of their encounters with Sakai. Singers Hikaru Utada and Nanase Aikawa, though not personally acquainted with Sakai, also issued memorial statements on their official web pages, describing how Sakai's death had shocked them.

Sakai is interred at Yokohama Midorinosato in Kanagawa Prefecture.

A public memorial service for Sakai was held the next day and was attended by some 40,000 people from all over Japan.

What a Beautiful Memory concert tours 
A series of memorial concerts were held at Osaka's Festival on September 6 and 7, as well as September 14 in Tokyo's Nippon Budokan, called What a Beautiful Memory. Tickets sold out immediately and 15,000 people gathered for the Tokyo event. Sakai's favorite microphone was placed center-stage, and a recording of Sakai's comments about her thoughts toward the lyrics from 2004 was played. Over 20 members of Sakai's band, who had come together again just for this occasion, began playing "Yureru Omoi". During the intermezzo, video images of the dressing room were shown, showing how staff had set it up in the same way Sakai used it during her What a Beautiful Moment concert tour. The door was labeled "Ms. Sakai Izumi" and the room had a clipboard displaying the day's schedule; lunch boxes were also prepared and laid out on a coffee table.

The band went on to perform 34 songs, ending with "Makenaide." When "Makenaide" ended, Sakai's recorded voice was played back to the sold-out crowd: "Thank you for coming today. I look forward to seeing you all again!" A portion of the proceeds from the concerts were donated to help fund cervical cancer research.

On the stage, nine giant screens showed more previously unreleased off-screen footage of Sakai, excerpts from 10,000 VHS tape recordings of Sakai in off-screen footage that her staff discovered after her death. In the encore of the memorial concerts, the music staff displayed some 300 songs in notebooks hand-written by Sakai that were found after she died.

Posthumous single: "Glorious Mind" 
"Glorious Mind" was released as a posthumous CD single on December 12, 2007. The song was used as the theme song of Detective Conan, Sakai's favorite Japanese anime. The song was broadcast with the episode airing on October 15.

What a Beautiful Memory Concert Tour 2008 
Sakai's office announced that there will be a nationwide tour to follow the What a Beautiful Memory tour. Announced on November 16, 2007, through Zard's official website, it will consist of 15 concerts at 13 locations in early 2008. The first concert will be at Kobe's International Forum on January 19 and the final one will commemorate the first anniversary of Sakai's death at the Yoyogi National Gymnasium in Yoyogi on May 27. None of the concerts will take place at the Tokyo International Forum, where the "What a Beautiful Moment" DVD was mainly recorded, or at Nippon Budokan. Additional previously unreleased footage of Sakai will be shown throughout the tour.

See also 

 Zard

References 

1967 births
2007 deaths
Japanese women pop singers
Japanese lyricists
People from Hadano, Kanagawa
People from Hiratsuka, Kanagawa
Accidental deaths from falls
Accidental deaths in Japan
Being Inc. artists
Former Stardust Promotion artists
Musicians from Kanagawa Prefecture
20th-century Japanese women singers
21st-century Japanese women singers